Ray William Johnson is an American internet celebrity best known for his eponymous YouTube channel and his web series on that channel, Equals Three. In 2013, the channel surpassed 10 million subscribers and had over 2 billion views, making it one of the most watched and subscribed to channels at the time. Johnson left the series in March 2014 but continued to produce it and other web series like Booze Lightyear, Comedians On, and Top 6, the first two of which were later cancelled.

Toward the end of his tenure at Equals Three, Johnson began branching out into other mediums. His first scripted web series, Riley Rewind, premiered on Facebook in 2013. He created a television concept that was purchased by FX the same year. He made his live-action acting debut in the indie road film Who's Driving Doug alongside former Breaking Bad star RJ Mitte (who portrayed Walter White Jr.). In 2015 his production company, Mom & Pop Empire, was reported to be co-producing a documentary with Supergravity Pictures about monopolies in the cable television industry.

Early life and education
Johnson was born and raised in Oklahoma City, Oklahoma, and attended Norman North High School, where he graduated in 1999. He later attended the Columbia University School of General Studies, where he studied history, but did not graduate. His goal was to later earn a law degree after completing his undergraduate studies. He began posting videos on YouTube during college. These videos were video blogs that Johnson published on a now-deleted channel. These early videos garnered a following of around thirty people.

Johnson states that he is of Native American heritage.

Career

Equals Three

Johnson began posting videos to his "Ray William Johnson" channel in April 2009. In 2011, the channel became YouTube's first to reach five million subscribers. The channel had also attained nearly two billion total views. Originally, Johnson produced videos out of his New York City apartment, but, in 2011, he signed a deal with Maker Studios to produce videos on set in Culver City, California. While at Maker Studios, Johnson produced a Spanish-language version of the series, Igual a Tres, and also produced a series of comedic animated music videos on a side channel called "Your Favorite Martian."

In October 2012, Johnson announced that he would be leaving Maker Studios, contending that they had been pressuring him to sign a new contract that limited his access to his AdSense account and would reportedly take 40% of his earnings from the series. The contract also would have required Johnson to give up 50% of his intellectual property rights to the show and his other animated web project, Your Favorite Martian. In November 2012, Johnson founded his own production studio, Equals Three Studios (then known as Runaway Planet), and continued producing Equals Three. Your Favorite Martian series was ended that same month.

In December 2013, Johnson announced that he would be ending Equals Three in the near future to focus on other projects. His last show as host (titled "THANK YOU FOR EVERYTHING") was published on March 12, 2014, and was around 14 minutes long. The channel had over 10 million subscribers and 2.6 billion total views at the time of Johnson's departure. The show returned in July 2014 with Robby Motz as host. Motz would depart in July 2015, at which point Kaja Martin, one of Johnson's frequent collaborators, took over as host, but Martin was subsequently replaced by Carlos Santos in December 2015.

In 2015, Johnson sued Jukin Media for requesting the removal of 40 Equals Three videos which sampled their content. The case was later settled.

The series featured numerous celebrity guests, including Robin Williams, Sarah Silverman, Gabriel Iglesias, John Cho, and Jason Biggs.

Scripted series

In December 2013, Johnson debuted his first scripted series, Riley Rewind, which was originally released on Facebook before migrating to YouTube. The series revolved around a teenager with a special time-shifting power. It was released in 5 parts and cumulatively totaled about 50 minutes. In 2015, Johnson reported the series had received 10 million views on Facebook.

Earlier in 2013, Johnson was in talks with FX Networks about a scripted series based on his life. The network gave Johnson a script commitment. The script was to be written by Mike Gagerman and Andrew Waller.

Other "Ray William Johnson" content

Since his departure from Equals Three, Johnson has continued producing comedic series for his main "Ray William Johnson" channel. These series included Booze Lightyear, Top 6, and Comedians On. Booze Lightyear was a scripted sketch comedy web series that featured a variety of different actors often in comedic situations. Johnson appeared on the series' first episode in February 2015. Top 6 is "list show" that is written and hosted by Kelly Landry and discusses 6 items about a given topic each episode. Top 6 also premiered in February 2015. Comedians On premiered in July 2015 and featured a collection of different comedians humorously discussing a chosen topic with Carlos Santos as host. "Comedians On" along with "Booze Lightyear" were eventually cancelled at roughly the same time that Carlos Santos became host of "Equals Three". All of these shows (including Equals Three itself) are produced by Equals Three Studios. Johnson occasionally appears in these shows and in "update vlogs" on the channel.

Acting and films
Johnson was attached to an indie film project entitled Who's Driving Doug in May 2014. He was cast in a role as a new driver for a disabled recluse played by former Breaking Bad star, RJ Mitte. The film was written by Michael Carnick, who uses a wheelchair as the result of a rare disorder, and also stars Paloma Kwiatkowski. Who's Driving Doug was released in February 2016. Johnson previously had a small part in Jay & Silent Bob's Super Groovy Cartoon Movie. He appeared in a series of advertisements for DiGiorno pizzas in January 2016, alongside Colleen Ballinger, DeStorm Power, and American football player Clay Matthews III.

Johnson is also the co-creator (with former Equals Three host, Kaja Martin) of the film production company, Mom & Pop Empire. They are currently working on a documentary project seeking to expose cable monopolies. Johnson and Martin are co-producers along with Max Benator and Marc Hustvedt's Supergravity Pictures. Johnson is expected to narrate the film. Mom & Pop Empire had previously co-produced a film called Manson Family Vacation with Mark and Jay Duplass. The film premiered at South by Southwest in 2015 and its distribution rights were purchased by Netflix soon after. Johnson and Martin are also working on a separate film starring Johnson and a long-form movie version of their web series Booze Lightyear as part of Mom & Pop Empire.

Filmography

Discography

Recognition and awards

Variety magazine called Johnson's scripted web series, Riley Rewind, the 7th best web series of 2013. Johnson was also listed among The Hollywood Reporters "Comedy Class of 2013." French YouTubers Antoine Daniel and Mathieu Sommet have cited Johnson's Equal 3 as their inspiration, respectively for What The Cut !? and Salut les Geeks !.

References

External links
 
 
 

1981 births
American male comedians
21st-century American comedians
American YouTubers
Columbia College (New York) alumni
Living people
Maker Studios people
Male actors from Oklahoma City
Number-one YouTube channels in subscribers
YouTube channels launched in 2009